The ITO Group one of the largest Egyptian companies founded in 1979 by engineer Karim Fathi Ashmawi concerns mainly with all activities of import and export, and supplying many industrial sectors with its demand of raw material the group's activities is expanded to include several other sectors,(International Crane Factory I.C.F) - (International Coke Company I.C.C) - (International Shipping Company I.S.C) -( International Integrated Systems I.I.S),the ITO group headquartered is located in Alexandria, Egypt.

ITO Group Companies overview

International Trade Office I.T.O

International Trade Office is one of the companies in Egypt that provides all kinds of raw materials to factories for iron and steel as well as different types of coke and carbon products and various kinds of iron alloys. And also provide all kinds of special chemical raw materials for the petrochemical and fertilizer sectors, chemical, glass, ceramics, dyes, pigments, lubricants, textiles, detergents and water treatment chemical and building materials.

International Coke Company I.C.C

Since 1998 the international coke and Ferroalloy company's growth period started from 2002 with exporting activity throughout the middle east, African, European markets.

International Crane Factory I.C.F

ICF- An Egyptian industrial entity since 1979 since that date, making overhead cranes and heavy mechanical equipment, steel works.
ICF located In New Borg El Arab in Alexandria–Egypt.

International Shipping Company I.S.C

International Shipping Company is a member of the ITO group, which established in 1998 and Located at Alexandria, Egypt. Its activities includes Shipping Agency, Owners Representatives, Freight Forwarder, Ships agency, freight forwarder, Customs Clearness & Marine Services all over Egyptians ports.

International Integrated Systems I.I.S

International Integrated Systems is an IT and management consulting company.

References

1979 establishments in Egypt
Conglomerate companies of Egypt
Business services companies established in 1979